Rebecca Lorch (February 20, 1990 – December 18, 2022) was an American competitive weightlifter and strongwoman.

Lorch was born in Dallas to Susan Steiner and Leonard Lorch. She grew up in Mesquite, Texas, with an elder brother, Jeremy. She attended Adelphi University as a theater major. Just before graduation she had a motorcycle accident that caused damage to her leg; during rehabilitation she developed an interest in nutrition and majored in it at Montclair State University.

Lorch started competing as a powerlifter and then entered strongwoman events in 2015. She won the lightweight class of America's Strongest Woman in 2019 and 2020. While competing she also worked as a nutrition coach. 

Lorch died by suicide on December 18, 2022, in Connecticut, at the age of 32.

References 

 

1990 births
American female weightlifters
Sportspeople from Dallas
American sportswomen
2022 deaths
2022 suicides
Suicides in Connecticut
Adelphi University alumni
Montclair State University alumni